The Galway Rally, Galway International Rally is an annual motorsport tarmac rallying event held in Galway, Ireland. Promoted and organised by Galway Motor Club, the rally was first ran in 1971. The Galway International Rally is the oldest International rally in Ireland. It has hosted the European Rally Championship stage every year between 1975 and 1982. In 1978 the Galway International Rally hosted the opening stage of the first Irish Tarmac Rally Championship.

History
The rally ran annually as an International event from its inception in 1971, with only few exceptions. In 2002 it was run under West International Rally name. For various reasons, the events did not run in 1983, 1987, 2003 and 2018.

Galway Rally boasts as the first ever International Rally run in Ireland (1971), the first round of the European Rally Championship run in Ireland (1975), the first computer-generated result system (1975), the first round of the new Irish Tarmac Rally Championship in (1978), the first female Clerk of the Course, Bridget Brophy (1982), the youngest Clerk of the Course of an any International Rally, Mike Smith (1988).

2022 event
The season opening rally consisting of over 150 starters ran over two days, 15 stages and 194.4 kilometres around Loughrea area. Scrutiny and Parc Ferme were located at Galway Racecourse, the start/finish podium was setup in the Eyre Square in Galway. The entry fee this year was €1195.

2021 event
The 50th anniversary event was cancelled due to ongoing COVID-19 pandemic. As restrictions eased off in the second half of the year, the 2022 was expected to take place on the usual first weekend of February.

2020 event
Due to low entries the rally launch on 17 January was cancelled, and there was a risk that the event will not go ahead. On 20 January it was announced that the 2020 Corrib Oil Galway International Rally is going to take place as planned on Sunday 2 February with a repeat of the racing format which made the previous year's event a success. The event, managed by Clerk of the Course Gary Leonard, consisted of 9 stages, totaling . The event was the opening round of the 2020 Irish Tarmac Rally Championship, and was run a week earlier than 2019 in order to avoid a clash with the opening British Rally Championship round, the Cambrian Rally. The participant entry fee for the event remained same as last year at €875. The event started with 65 entries, 47 of them reached the finish, with Alastair Fisher as the overall winner. This was the only 2020 championship round that took place before the outbreak of the coronavirus pandemic. On 28 April the Tarmac Rally Organisers' Association announced that the 2020 Irish Tarmac Rally Championship is cancelled.

2019 event
Originally planned as two day event, it was reduced to one day, 10 stage event after a consultation with participants. The rally hosted Round 1 of 2019 ITRC and Round 2 of 2019 ITRC Historic championships. Craig Breen finished first overall, 14.4s ahead of Alastair Fisher.

2018 event
The event was planned to go ahead in February, however, in November 2017 it was announced that the event is being cancelled due lack of "the necessary financial certainty that is required at this time". Event organisers Galway Motor Club also quoted logistical issues as a reason for cancellation.

2017 event
The event planning was counteracted by efforts to stop the rally. One local resident claimed that application for road closures was not properly dealt with. There were very strict conditions attached to the temporary road closure permission. After consultation with local politicians and the Galway County Council it was ruled that the organisers have complied with all of the procedures relating to a temporary road closure, and that the event is cleared to go ahead.

2016 event

Roll of Honor

Top drivers with most wins (>1) / most starts (>11). (As of 2022)

External links
 Official Event website
 The old official website
 Official Facebook page
 Galway Motor Club website
 Galway Motor Club Facebook page

References

Annual events in Ireland
Rally competitions in Ireland
Motorsport in Ireland
Motorsport competitions in Ireland
Sport in Galway (city)
Sport in County Galway